Jacqueline "Jackie" Mason Kendall-Baker (15 June 1935 – 9 April 2020) was an Australian pair skater who competed at the 1956 and 1960 Winter Olympics in a pairing with Mervyn Bower. In 1956, they failed to take to the ice after Bower was injured. In 1960, they placed twelfth out of thirteen duos. In 1979 she was a judge in the World Figure Skating Championships in Vienna; in 1980 Mason was a judge in the Winter Olympics.

Results
(with Bower)

Notes

References 
 
 Jacqueline Mason's profile at Sports Reference.com
 Jacqueline Mason's obituary

1935 births
2020 deaths
Australian female pair skaters
Olympic figure skaters of Australia
Figure skaters at the 1956 Winter Olympics
Figure skaters at the 1960 Winter Olympics